KPT Officers Society is a neighbourhood of Kiamari Town in Karachi, Sindh, Pakistan.

KPT Officers Society Scandal
Karachi Port Trust has reclaimed close to 250 acres of land along the Mai Kolachi Bypass from the wetlands where once mangroves and flamingos used to be the norm. The Sindh Board of Revenue sprang into action and took the KPT to court asserting its position that all land belongs to the Sindh Board of Revenue and KPT was required to lease it from them. KPT on the other hand asserted its position that the Sindh Board of Revenue had no claim and that they were entitled to act as the owner of all land within roughly 50 yards of the high water mark. The courts decided that a “third party interest” had been created, meaning that the ordinary and innocent public that now owned those plots should not be made to suffer because of a dispute between these two parties.

As of February 2019, Sindh High Court decided the land dispute between the KPT officers housing society and the government of Sindh in favor of the KPT housing society.

References

External links 
 KPT, PQA sold land worth Rs88 bn to DHA for only Rs15m

Neighbourhoods of Karachi